Predrag Miletić, (born ), is a Serbian  film, television, and theatre actor. Since 1981, Predrag Miletić has been a full-time member of the National Theatre in Belgrade, where he has appeared in more than 50 plays. Since 2014 he is the chairman of the board of the Puppet Theatre "Pinocchio" and since 2015 is the President of the Program Committee of the International Festival of Monodrama and Mime in Zemun.

Early life 
Predrag Miletić was born in Niš, Socialist Federal Republic of Yugoslavia (now Serbia). His mother, Ružica Miletić (née Ilić), was a housewife, and his father, Lieutenant Vladimir Miletić (1919–2010), was a Yugoslav intelligence officer, winner of a number of decorations, including two medals for bravery. Miletić has one sister, Slavica. He is of Serbian ancestry, and  Bosnian ancestry on his father's side. As a child, Predrag lived in Niš with her family, and moved to Belgrade in order to study at the Faculty of Dramatic Arts.

Education 
After finishing high school, he has entered the drama studio at the National Theatre in Niš. After two years in the studio, he has enrolled Faculty of Drama Arts in Belgrade, in the class of professor Ognjenka Milićević, with the assistant Vladimir Jevtović. During the studies had a professional expertise with Olga Skovran and with Eva Ruth-Ronen from Royal Academy of Dramatic Art in London. Graduated on 22. jun 1981. with performance "I'm selling wrecked Fića, maybe in pieces" by Bratislav Petković.

Career
He was a full-time member of National Theatre in Niš even before the faculty, from 1972 to 1976. Since 1981, Predrag Miletić has been member of the National Theatre in Belgrade, where he has appeared in more than 40 dramas. Also, he has appeared in almost all Serbian series since 1980, and has shot a number of domestic and foreign films. He is the only member of the Serbian National theater who has been employed professionally both in the opera and drama department. He was a member of the "Z Teater", run by actor and director Milenko Zablaćanski, and he participated in the famous Edinburgh International Festival in Edinburgh, Scotland. His first main role was in André Roussin's La Mamma as Antoni in Terazije Theatre in Belgrade.

He wrote a book about his journey from Beograd to the Serbian monastery Hilandar on Mount Athos in Greece by bicycle with his godfather Oliver Njego, solo-singer from National Theater. The book is "Biciklom do Hilandara". ("By bicycle to Hilandar")

Since 2014, he is the president of the board of Puppet Theatre "Pinocchio", and since 2015, he is the president of the program council of the international Festival of monodrama and mime in Zemun, Belgrade.

Performances 

Predrag Miletić participated in more than 100 plays, TV film and series, movies and operas throughout his career, including:

Movies

Personal life 
Predrag married Gordana Miletić (née Krstić) in Niš in May 1979. With her, he has two sons, Vuk and Tadija, both of them working in theater.

See also 
 Ognjenka Milićević
 Milenko Zablaćanski

References

External links 

Predrag Miletić (www.hollywoodupclose.com)

1952 births
Living people
Actors from Niš
Serbian male film actors
20th-century Serbian male opera singers
Serbian male stage actors
Serbian male television actors
Serbian autobiographers
University of Belgrade Faculty of Dramatic Arts alumni